RED People is a Malaysian online supergroup and artist management company founded by rapper-songwriter Namewee. It was established with the aim of integrating the forces of Malaysian online personalities, and prepare them for mainstream media.

History
RED People Artistes started recruiting online personalities with a strong following on YouTube in late 2013 before it was established on January 1, 2014. Its first video, "You're Not Red" (你不紅), was uploaded onto YouTube on March 23, 2014. It rose to fame when Joyce Chu's video for "Malaysia Chabor" was uploaded on May 23, 2014. Following that, a series of videos were uploaded onto YouTube, encompassing a wide range of video types, including another music video for "Sambal Party" (38派對) during the 2014 FIFA World Cup period, RED News, which imitates the news and several videos by its artistes.

In November 2014, RED People created a boy band, P-High, consisting of Charles Tee, Kevin Tan, Jimmy Tan, Wong Xiao Le and Wilbur Ng. Their song, Very Shuai (Very帅), gained over 100,000 views within a day. In December 2014, it launched girl group Amoi-Amoi, composed of May Ng, Stella Chen and Strawberry. Their cover of Chopstick Brothers' "Little Apple", which includes a number of Malaysian fruits, received more than 18,283,900 or more views on YouTube at August 2022.

In January 2015, RED People released their first Chinese New Year album, entitled "Red Red People Red Red Year" (红红年), which included the song "七洞强" as well as some others.

Works
The following are some of the works done by RED People:

Surely Sensored (保证马赛克)
A series which talks about 18+ Sexual things, Hosted by 糖糖.

RED News (紅人主播)
It is a series of videos uploaded on YouTube, which provide updates regarding RED People's artistes in the style of a news broadcast, with Christal Yap, Rumiko, Jimmy Tan, Dato sai and Wong Xiao Le as the news anchors. The first episode was uploaded on August 9, 2014.

Fitting Queen (時尚試裝節目)
Such videos show female artistes going to several fashion shops to try some of the clothes they sell. The first video was uploaded on October 18, 2014.

Kongkam Show
In such videos, the artistes compete against each other and challenge themselves to do various activities.

Opera ABC
It is a musical drama which revolves around a school theme, known as RED School, which began broadcast on November 4, 2014. The Second Series Broadcast On June 8, 2019. It revolve around public theme. The First Series is Called Opera ABC- Just Shuffle, The Second Series is called Opera ABC- Just do it 啪啪啪 with lesser actor.

Dato Sai (拿督賽)
It is a series of Cantonese-language videos starring Charles Tee together with other artistes.

Members

Namewee Production
Namewee 黄明志 (Boss Of Namewee Production)
Michiyo Ho 何念慈 (Part Of Namewee Production)

Amoi-Amoi
(A girl band created in December 2014)
 Benny Ong Ee-Teng (Wang Yi-Ting) (ET) 王依渟 (part of Amoi-Amoi)
 May Ng Choi-Mei (Wu Cui-Mei) 吳翠媚 (part of Amoi-Amoi)
 Mays Hong Shao-Qi 洪少琦 (part of Amoi-Amoi)
 Stella Chen Yue-Qing 曾樂晴 (晴晴) (part of Amoi-Amoi)

Former Members
 Stawberry Lin Mei-Yu (林美瑜) (part of Amoi-Amoi since 2014 and graduated on 2016, now a soloist)

P-High
(A boy band created in November 2014)
 A-vin Yan 炎柏韋 (part of P-HIGH 屁孩)
 Charles Tee 鄭秋寶 (拿督賽, 鄭少) (part of P-HIGH 屁孩)
 Christopher Damart 克利斯 (part of P-HIGH 屁孩)
 Kean Tan 陳德健 (part of P-HIGH 屁孩)
 Kevin Tan 陳健豪 (part of P-HIGH 屁孩)
 Koay 郭建榮 (part of P-HIGH 屁孩)
 Wilbur Ng 黄勁達 (Mr. 達人) (part of P-HIGH 屁孩)
 Wong Xiao Le 王崧了 (小了) (part of P-HIGH 屁孩)
 Jimmy Tan 陳吉米 (part of P-HIGH 屁孩) (2014–2019, deceased) -- former member

Others
 Christal Yap (Crystal Hishico, Yap Wei Wei) 葉緯煒
 Diorlynn Ong 翁依玲
 Hannya (Shee Su Hui) 寒婭
 Hapii Miiao 凱特玲
 Hishiko 張沁賢 
 Joyce Chu 朱主愛 (四葉草)
 Katrina Low 劉韋凌
 MC Fang 朱寶芳 (MC阿芳)
 Michiyo Ho 何念兹 (何戀慈)
 Rumiko (Su Wei) 徐紓薇
 Sean Huang 黃宥翔
 Strawberry Lin Mei-Yu 林美瑜 (草莓) (Amoi-Amoi graduate of 2016) 
 Sukie Lai 賴曉琪
 Tammy Ong 王慧瑜
 Yiky Kho 郭筱鹿
 Yuki Lee 陳太

Criticism
RED People's videos have received a number of feedback, including positive and negative ones. In May 2014, Joyce Chu's video for "Malaysia Chabor" spawned a number of parodies and covers, including that of Gary Chun's "Singapore Da Por", which he showed his affection for Chu. Similarly, in June 2014, a video involving Charles Tee mentioning "Bye Malaysia, Redang I am coming" received numerous negative criticism by Facebook fans. A video of him apologizing was uploaded later on.

Discography

Extended plays
 P-High (by P-High) (2015)
  Joyce Chu (by Joyce Chu) (2015)
 Michiyo  (by Michiyo Ho) (2016)
 Merry Cold Christmas 在一起 冷冷 der 聖誕節 (by Joyce Chu) (2016)

Chinese New Year Albums
 Red Red People Red Red Year 紅紅年 (2015)
 CNY AGAIN ?! 紅紅又來過新年 (2016)

Photobook 
 Abandoned (2015)

Singles

References

External links
 
 

Malaysian YouTubers
Supergroups (music)